Vanadium nitride, VN, is a chemical compound of vanadium and nitrogen.

Vanadium nitride is formed during the nitriding of steel and increases wear resistance. Another phase, V2N, also referred to as vanadium nitride, can be formed along with VN during nitriding. VN has a cubic, rock-salt structure. There is also a low-temperature form, which contains V4 clusters. 
The low-temperature phase results from a dynamic instability, when the energy of vibrational modes in the high-temperature NaCl-structure phase, are reduced below zero.

It is a strong-coupled superconductor. Nanocrystalline vanadium nitride has been claimed to have potential for use in supercapacitors. The properties of vanadium nitride depend sensitively on the stoichiometry of the material.

References 

Vanadium(III) compounds
Nitrides
Rock salt crystal structure